Oum El Achar is a village in the commune of Tindouf, in Tindouf Province, Algeria, located at the base of a mountain pass. It is connected to the N50 national highway by a long local road leading south from the village.

References

Neighbouring towns and cities

Populated places in Tindouf Province